The murders of Margaret Tapp and Seana Tapp, sometimes simply referred to as the Tapp murders, are unsolved crimes that occurred on 7 August 1984. The murders have been described as one of the most notorious unsolved murder cases in Australian history.

Background
Margaret Christine Tapp (3 June 1949 – 7 August 1984), a 35-year-old nurse who was studying law, and her nine-year-old daughter, Seana Lee Tapp (6 March 1975 - 7 August 1984) lived in Ferntree Gully, Victoria, Australia.

Investigation 
Late on 6 August or early on 7 August 1984, an unknown assailant or assailants entered the home, beating, then strangling them to death with a section of rope. The victims' bodies were found in their beds in their nightwear the following day. Seana had been raped prior to her murder.

The case was investigated but quickly went cold. As there were no signs of forced entry, and the victims were attacked in their beds, the perpetrator(s) were probably known to them and aware of the broken lock on the back door.

Other leads included a Dunlop Volley footprint and a red utility vehicle seen parked nearby which was never traced.
Potential suspects included work colleagues and acquaintances of the single mother, including a doctor who had been paying the house rent prior to his death.

Several suspects were later eliminated via DNA analysis, although complications in 2008 pertaining to the contamination of samples retrieved from the murder scene have cast doubts upon the earlier elimination of some suspects from the police inquiry.

In 2015, investigators reopened the case in a cold case review including the help of well known ex-investigator Ron Iddles. In 2017, an 1 million reward was offered for information that could lead to a conviction.

Aftermath
The Tapps are buried in Ferntree Gully Cemetery.

See also
 Crime in Australia
 List of unsolved murders

Notes

References

Cited works and further reading

External links
 
 
 Margaret and Seana Tapp, True Crime Sisters, 9 August 2017
 The Tapp Tragedy, Life and Crimes with Andrew Rule, 21 April 2018
 The Unsolved 1984 Tapp Murders. Australian True Crime with Emily Webb and Meshel Laurie, 24 January 2019

1980s in Melbourne
1984 murders in Australia
Australian murder victims
Deaths by person in Australia
Deaths by strangulation
Female murder victims
Murdered Australian children
People murdered in Victoria (Australia)
Unsolved murders in Australia
Violence against women in Australia
Incidents of violence against girls